The Zaccaria family was an ancient and noble Genoese dynasty that had great importance in the development and consolidation of the Republic of Genoa in the thirteenth century and in the following period. The Zaccarias were characterized by, according to scholarly handwritten documents of the time, having broad intelligence and their effective way of maintaining political power through manipulation.

History 
The Zaccaria family was a very prominent family in the Republic of Genoa. Also following the Treaty of Nymphaeum of 1261, Michael VIII Palaiologos granted the Genoese the commercial exploitation of the Empire of Nicaea, as a reward for the help received in the recovery of the Byzantine Empire, and, more generally, in an anti-Venetian function. In this scenario, the Zaccaria family, in 1275 , assumed the lordship of Phocaea, first with Manuele then with his son Tedisio and, then, with Benedetto I Zaccaria. Phocaea was an important commercial port, with its hinterland rich in alum, mineral at the time used for the tanning of leathers and fabrics.

In Genoa, they established intense relationships with the most important families of the aristocracy through marriages: 

 Orietta Zaccaria married Reinaldo Spinola
 Velocchia Zaccaria married Nicoloso Doria
 Palaeologus Zaccaria married Giacomina Spinola
 Argentina Zaccaria married Paolino Doria
 Eliana Zaccaria married Andreolo Cattaneo della Volta

The Zacharias controlled all the alum trade: from extraction to transport to its transformation and sale mainly in Flanders.

After alternating events that saw the Zaccarias lose, at the hands of the Venetians, and reconquer Phocaea and the island of Chios, they also took possession of the island of Samos. Benedict II, known as the Palaeologus, son of Benedetto Zaccaria, on his death in 1307, assumed the title of lord of Phocaea and Chios.

He was succeeded in the title by his two sons, Martino Zaccaria and Benedetto III, a lordship that was reconfirmed with the dominion of Samo, Tenedo, Marmora, Mytilene and Martino's investiture as King and Despot for himself and all his descendants. After various events, he married in 1320 with Jacqueline de la Roche, the last heir of the Dukes of Athens, receiving as a dowry the baronies of Veligosti in Messenia and Damala in Argolide, he died in İzmir in 1345. His son Centurione I Zaccaria inherited the title of Baron of Damala. Centurione was married to the daughter of Andronikos Asen, the son of Ivan Asen III of Bulgaria and Irena Palaeologus, daughter of Michael VIII Palaiologos. Centurione assumed the office of Balio of Morea which he kept until his death in 1382.

See also
Republic of Genoa
Doria (family)
Adorno family
Michael VIII Palaiologos
House of Spinola
House of Damalas

References

 
Republic of Genoa families